The Pearl Maker of Madrid (German:Der Perlenmacher von Madrid) is a 1921 German silent drama film directed by Eberhard Frowein and starring Hermann Wlach, Herma van Delden and Maria Merlott. It premiered in Berlin on 1 July 1921.

Cast
 Hermann Wlach   
 Herma van Delden   
 Maria Merlott   
 Lo Bergner   
 Traute Berndt   
 Eva Christa   
 Richard Georg   
 Kurt Hänsel   
 Richard Kirsch   
 Walter von Allwoerden

References

Bibliography
 Grange, William. Cultural Chronicle of the Weimar Republic.Scarecrow Press, 2008.

External links

1921 films
Films of the Weimar Republic
German silent feature films
German drama films
Films directed by Eberhard Frowein
Films set in Madrid
1921 drama films
German black-and-white films
Silent drama films
1920s German films